Domestic Girlfriend is a 2019 anime series based on the manga which was written and illustrated by Kei Sasuga. The series was animated by Diomedéa and aired from 12 January to 30 March 2019, on the Animeism programming block on MBS, TBS, and BS-TBS. The anime television series adaptation was announced on 12 July 2018. The series is directed by Shōta Ihata and written by Tatsuya Takahashi, with animation by studio Diomedéa. Naomi Ide provides the character designs for the series. 

The series was licensed by Sentai Filmworks which acquired the distribution rights for the series in North America, the British Isles, Australasia, South Africa, and other territories, and simulcast the series on select platforms.


Episode list

Notes

References

External links
 

Domestic Girlfriend